Turan is a rural locality (a selo) in Tunkinsky District, Republic of Buryatia, Russia. The population was 711 as of 2010. There are 20 streets.

Geography 
Turan is located 34 km west of Kyren (the district's administrative centre) by road. Khoyto-Gol is the nearest rural locality.

References 

Rural localities in Tunkinsky District